Mint Jam is the second live album of the American jazz group Yellowjackets, released in 2001.

Track listing

Personnel 
 Russell Ferrante – acoustic piano, synthesizers 
 Jimmy Haslip – electric bass
 Marcus Baylor – drums
 Bob Mintzer – tenor saxophone, EWI

Production 
 Yellowjackets – producers
 Rich Breen – recording, mixing 
 Scott Camarota – assistant engineer
 Geoff Gillette – house sound engineer
 Tom Baker – mastering 
 Margi Denton – art direction, design 
 Harry Chamberlain – photography 
 Glen La Ferman – band photography
 Recorded live at The Mint (Los Angeles, California).
 Mastered at Precision Mastering (Los Angeles, California).

References

2001 live albums
Yellowjackets albums
Live instrumental albums